is a train station in Fuchū, Hiroshima Prefecture, Japan.

Lines
West Japan Railway Company
Fukuen Line

Adjacent stations

|-
!colspan=5|JR West

Railway stations in Hiroshima Prefecture
Railway stations in Japan opened in 1914